Dance of the Hours is a short ballet and is the act 3 finale of the opera La Gioconda composed by Amilcare Ponchielli. It depicts the hours of the day through solo and ensemble dances. The opera was first performed in 1876 and was revised in 1880. Later performed on its own, the Dance of the Hours was at one time one of the best known and most frequently performed ballets. It became even more widely known after its inclusion in the 1940 Walt Disney animated film Fantasia where it is depicted as a comic ballet featuring ostriches, hippopotamuses, elephants and alligators.

Description
The ballet, accompanied by an orchestra, appears at the end of the third act of the opera, in which the character Alvise, who heads the Inquisition, receives his guests in a large and elegant ballroom adjoining the death chamber. The music and choreography represent the hours of dawn, day (morning), twilight and night. Costume changes and lighting effects reinforce the progression. The dance is intended to symbolize the eternal struggle between the forces of light and darkness. It is about 10 minutes long.

Structure
The piece begins with an introduction in G major, with vocal assistance in the form of a recitative which is omitted in the symphonic version. Then follows in sequence: the dance of the hours of dawn, the hours of day, the hours of the night and the morning.

The episode devoted to dawn (in E major) merges with the extensive introduction to the episode dedicated to daytime hours, anticipating the rhythmic structure of four notes, which characterizes the episode. The transition point between the two episodes, where it marks the birth of the day, coincides with the intervention in fortissimo of the chorus (""), which follows a slow chromatic passage, typical of Ponchielli's style.

After a brief episode in C minor devoted to the night, based on figuration in staccato, a connected and expressive melody in E minor, played by cellos, introduces the morning. A new pathetic melody in A minor extends to a broad phrase with initial tone in E minor.

A brief diminuendo precedes the attacca of the final coda in A major, a vigorous can-can in the manner of Romualdo Marenco's  (1881), introduced by an abrupt change of tempo to allegro vivacissimo.

Derivative works

The tune is remembered by the character Leopold Bloom in James Joyce's novel Ulysses (1922).
Dance of the Hours is one of the most frequently parodied pieces of classical music. An extract was first used by the Walt Disney Animation Studios in one of their earliest cartoon series (Silly Symphonies). The ballet was used in full in the Walt Disney animated film Fantasia (1940), albeit with ballet-dancing hippos (complete with tutus), ostriches, alligators and elephants including Madame Upanova, Hyacinth Hippo, Elephanchine, and Ben Ali Gator.
It was the source of the tune for the song "Like I Do", which was a hit in 1962 for Nancy Sinatra in Italy and Japan, Maureen Evans in the UK and Ireland, and Teresa Brewer in 1963 (as "She'll Never Love You (Like I Do)") in the USA.
Segments of the piece formed the basis for the Andrews Sisters song "Idle Chatter" (1952) written by Al Sherman.
The melody of Dance of the Hours was used by Allan Sherman in his biggest hit "Hello Muddah, Hello Fadduh (A Letter from Camp)" (1963), and its sequel "Return to Camp Granada" (1965). This ballad also mentions James Joyce's novel Ulysses, which references the same melody.
Choreographer Christopher Wheeldon created a new rendition of Dance of the Hours for his ballet company, Morphoses. The work was featured in the company's New York debut, in 2006 at the Metropolitan Opera House, New York.

References

External links 
 
 Full libretto of La Gioconda at Impressrio by Kernkonzepte, 2005
 , choreography by Victoria Lyras

Compositions by Amilcare Ponchielli
1876 ballet premieres
Opera excerpts
1876 compositions
Compositions in E major